Henri Jean LaBorde (September 11, 1909 – September 16, 1993) was an American discus thrower who won a silver medal at the 1932 Olympics. He attended Lowell High School in an Francisco. Next year he won the NCAA and the IC4A titles and had a world's best throw of 50.38 m while on a European tour in Düsseldorf. He also occasionally competed in the shot put.

References

1909 births
1993 deaths
American male discus throwers
Olympic silver medalists for the United States in track and field
Athletes (track and field) at the 1932 Summer Olympics
Stanford Cardinal men's track and field athletes
Track and field athletes from California
Medalists at the 1932 Summer Olympics